Whatuwhiwhi is a settlement at the northern end of Tokerau Beach, on the Karikari Peninsula of Northland, New Zealand. To the south is Doubtless Bay.

Kaitaia is about 39 km away.

There are three shaded and sandy coves. Swimming is safe, but it is not a good anchorage because it is exposed to the south-east.

de Surville
French explorer Jean-François-Marie de Surville and his crew in the ship St Jean Baptiste were the first Europeans to enter Doubtless Bay, just 8 days after James Cook had named it. They anchored off Rangiawhia Pa, just north east of Whatuwhiwhi, on 17 December 1769, and gathered cresses and green plants from the shore. Here Father Paul-Antoine Léonard de Villefeix (chaplain on the St Jean Baptiste) conducted the first Christian service in New Zealand waters when he celebrated Mass on Christmas Day 1769. A storm on 27 December stranded a party of men on shore at Whatuwhiwhi, where they were treated hospitably by the local Māori. In the same storm, the ship dragged her anchors, which had to be cut. The ship's yawl, which was in tow, struck rocks and was also cut free.

After the storm, and the stranded party had returned to the ship, on 31 December 1769, the yawl was spotted ashore on Tokerau Beach surrounded by Māori, and an armed party set off to retrieve it. They found a group of Māori carrying spears, and the chief, Ranginui, approached de Surville carrying a twig of green leaves as a sign of peace. De Surville arrested Ranginui for the theft of his boat. His party burned about 30 huts, destroyed one canoe filled with nets, and confiscated another. They brought Ranginui back to their ship, where the crew members who had been stranded during the storm identified him as the chief who had been hospitable to them. However, De Surville was determined to keep his captive, and St Jean Baptiste sailed for Peru the same day with Ranginui on board. He died of scurvy, 12 weeks later.

A plaque commemorating this visit was unveiled at Whatuwhiwhi in 1969. The anchors abandoned during the storm were located and raised in a community effort on 21 December 1974.

Demographics
Statistics New Zealand describes Karikari, which corresponds to Whatuwhiwhi, as a rural settlement. Whatuwhiwhi is part of the larger Karikari Peninsula statistical area.

Whatuwhiwhi had a population of 492 at the 2018 New Zealand census, an increase of 24 people (5.1%) since the 2013 census, and an increase of 93 people (23.3%) since the 2006 census. There were 171 households, comprising 240 males and 252 females, giving a sex ratio of 0.95 males per female, with 99 people (20.1%) aged under 15 years, 51 (10.4%) aged 15 to 29, 210 (42.7%) aged 30 to 64, and 141 (28.7%) aged 65 or older.

Ethnicities were 52.4% European/Pākehā, 57.9% Māori, 8.5% Pacific peoples, 1.2% Asian, and 2.4% other ethnicities. People may identify with more than one ethnicity.

Of those people who chose to answer the census's question about religious affiliation, 40.9% had no religion, 49.4% were Christian, 1.2% had Māori religious beliefs, 0.6% were Hindu, 0.6% were Muslim and 1.2% had other religions.

Of those at least 15 years old, 30 (7.6%) people had a bachelor or higher degree, and 96 (24.4%) people had no formal qualifications. 24 people (6.1%) earned over $70,000 compared to 17.2% nationally. The employment status of those at least 15 was that 132 (33.6%) people were employed full-time, 63 (16.0%) were part-time, and 33 (8.4%) were unemployed.

Education

Rangiawhia Native School opened in Whatuwhiwhi on 27 January 1902. Wiremu Taua was the head teacher until 1919. This was an experiment to staff a Native School with Māori staff, and Taua was the first Māori person to become a head teacher. The school gained a reputation for excellence, and more Māori head teachers were appointed for native schools. The school gained new buildings in 1906. The average roll was 20 students. It no longer operates.

Te Kura Kaupapa Māori o Rangiawhia was a coeducational full primary school (years 1-8) which taught fully in the Māori language. It closed at the end of 2016.

Notes

External links

de Surville's Anchor

Far North District
Populated places in the Northland Region